Joan W. Lawrence was a member of the Ohio House of Representatives from 1983–2000. Her district consisted of a portion of Delaware County, Ohio. She was succeeded by Jon Peterson.

References

External links
Profile on the Ohio Ladies' Gallery website
Ohio Redistricting Competition

1930s births
Republican Party members of the Ohio House of Representatives
Women state legislators in Ohio
Living people
21st-century American women